The Mackinnons was a BBC Scotland drama series, which started in 1977. It starred Bill Simpson as the head of the Mackinnon family, a vet in the fictional Argyll town of Inverglen (the opening shot actually showed Inveraray). It was seen as inhabiting similar terrain to Dr. Finlay's Casebook and Sutherland's Law, but was less successful.

External links 
IMDB entry
photo of Simpson in the part

Television shows set in Scotland
Argyllshire
Fictional veterinarians
1970s British drama television series
BBC television dramas
English-language television shows